White Water Bay is a water park at Six Flags Fiesta Texas amusement park in San Antonio, Texas.  Opened in 1992 as Ol' Waterin' Hole, the water park is included with the price of admission to Six Flags Fiesta Texas. It is owned and operated by Six Flags. It was originally named Ol' Waterin' Hole from 1992 to 1998 and Armadillo Beach from 1999 to 2005.

List of attractions

Former water park attractions

References

External links

 Six Flags Fiesta Texas official website

Six Flags water parks
Six Flags Fiesta Texas
Water parks in Texas
1992 establishments in Texas